 
An Itford Hill Style Settlement is a form of later Bronze Age settlement found in Southern England and named after the site of Itford Hill in East Sussex. It is a Monument Class Description defined by English Heritage as part of their Monuments Protection Programme.

According to English Heritage's general description, these sites are formed of a number of enclosures which "generally take the form of a single low bank, which marks the perimeter of each enclosure". Associations have been made between Itford Hill style sites and burial monuments located nearby.

A number of examples occur on the South Downs of Sussex, the most notable being Itford Hill and Black Patch, both of which have been extensively excavated.

See also
Deverel-Rimbury culture

Notes

References

External links
Itford Hill Style Settlement monument class description from English Heritage

Bronze Age England
Types of monuments and memorials
History of East Sussex
Southern England